Massacre in Dinosaur Valley, also known as Amazonas and Cannibal Ferox II, is a 1985 cannibal film directed by Michele Massimo Tarantini under the pseudonym Michael E. Lemick. An international co-production of Italy and Brazil, the film was written by Tarantini with Dardano Sacchetti, and stars Michael Sopkiw, Suzane Carvalho, Milton Rodríguez, Marta Anderson, and Joffre Soares.

Cast
 Michael Sopkiw as Kevin Hall
 Suzane Carvalho as Eva Ibañez
 Milton Rodríguez as Captain John Heinz
 Marta Anderson as Betty Heinz
 Joffre Soares as Josè
 Gloria Cristal as Myara
 Susan Hahn as Belinda

Production
The film was shot in Brazil in 1985 under the working title of Stranded in the Valley of Dinosaurs.

Reception
A reviewer credited as "Lor." of Variety reviewed the Lightning Video home video on January 10, 1987. "Lor." described the film as a "poor Italian exploitation film, made worse by an intentionally misleading title: there are no dinosaurs or fantasy elements in this potboiler." The review concluded that "This sexploitationer mixes prat-fall comedy, disrobing women and the usual gore carelessly."

Home media
On 29 September 2020, the film was released on DVD and Blu-ray by Severin Films.

References

Sources

External links
 
 

1985 films
1985 horror films
1985 multilingual films
1980s Italian-language films
1980s Portuguese-language films
Films directed by Michele Massimo Tarantini
Cannibal-boom films
Italian erotic horror films
Films set in Brazil
Italian multilingual films
Brazilian multilingual films
English-language Italian films
English-language Brazilian films
Cockfighting in film
1980s Italian films